Amorphophallus preussii is a species of plant in the family Araceae. It is endemic to Cameroon. Its natural habitats are lowland tropical and subtropical moist broadleaf forests and subtropical and montane tropical and subtropical coniferous forests. It is a Vulnerable species threatened by habitat loss.

References

preussii
Endemic flora of Cameroon
Vulnerable plants
Taxonomy articles created by Polbot
Taxa named by N. E. Brown
Taxa named by Adolf Engler